S. L. Harris was a South African cricket umpire. He stood in four Test matches between 1910 and 1923.

See also
 List of Test cricket umpires

References

Year of birth missing
Year of death missing
Place of birth missing
South African Test cricket umpires